Kumara Venkata Bhupala Puram or K. V. B. Puram is a village in Tirupati district of the Indian state of Andhra Pradesh. It is the mandal headquarters of K. V. B. Puram mandal and is located in Srikalahasti revenue division.

References 

Mandal headquarters in Tirupati district
Villages in Tirupati district